Kyriakides is a surname. Notable people with the surname include:

Anastasios "Takis" Kyriakides (born 1946), Greek-American businessman and inventor 
Charalambos Kyriakides (born 1998), Cypriot footballer
Daniel Kyriakides (born 1995), Welsh field hockey player
James Kyriakides (born 1991), Welsh field hockey player
Stella Kyriakides (born 1956), Cypriot psychologist and politician
Stylianos Kyriakides (1910–1987), Cypriot marathon runner 
Yannis Kyriakides (born 1969), Cypriot composer